usually refers to the Harajuku district in Tokyo, Japan. It may also refer to:

Harajuku station
Hara-juku (Tōkaidō), the thirteenth post station on the Tōkaidō
Harajuku (dance project)
Japanese street fashion, also known by the term harajuku